The 2001 Montreal municipal election took place on November 4, 2001, to elect a mayor and city councillors in Montreal, Quebec, Canada. Gérald Tremblay defeated incumbent Pierre Bourque to become mayor of the newly amalgamated city. This was the only municipal election that was held for the amalgamated city (the amalgamation took effect on January 1, 2002), as the next municipal election was for the defused city.

All mayoral candidates were also allowed to run for a seat on council, with "alternates" who would assume the council seat if the mayoral candidates were elected to both offices.

Results

Mayor

Council (incomplete)

Borough councils (incomplete)

Composition of city and borough councils

Depending on their borough, Montrealers voted for:
 
 Mayor of Montreal
 One, two, or three city councillors for the whole borough or one for each district, who are also borough councillors
 Zero or one additional borough councillors for the whole borough or for each district

Information about the candidates
Montreal Island Citizens Union
Robert Blondin (Louis-Cyr) appears to have been a first-time candidate. During the 1980s, a person named Robert Blondin chaired the Parti Québécois's riding committee in Saint-Henri and criticized René Lévesque's decision to de-emphasize the party's focus on Quebec sovereignty. This may have been the same person.
Gilles Marette (Louis-Riel) was a first time candidate.
Nancy Boileau (Maisonneuve) is a community activist. In 2000, she sought to initiate a class-action lawsuit on behalf of commuters who had waited in cold weather for city buses that never arrived or were too full to pick up more passengers. In the 2001 campaign, she campaigned against gentrification and for more affordable housing.

Vision Montreal
Lino Colapelle (Saint-Léonard-Est borough council) was a first-time candidate.
White Elephant Party
Charles Paradis (Jean-Rivard), Daniel Paré (Louis-Cyr) and Denis Fournier (Saint-Léonard) were first-time candidates.
Independents
Steve Gentile (Port-Maurice) was a first-time candidate. There is a noted designer in Saint-Leonard named Steve Gentile, though it is not known if this is the same person.

Seat-by-seat results

Ahuntsic-Cartierville

Anjou

Beaconsfield–Baie-D'Urfé

Côte-des-Neiges–Notre-Dame-de-Grâce

Côte-Saint-Luc–Hampstead–Montreal West

Dollard-Des Ormeaux–Roxboro

Dorval–L'Île-Dorval

L'Île-Bizard–Sainte-Geneviève–Sainte-Anne-de-Bellevue

Kirkland

Lachine

LaSalle

Mercier–Hochelaga-Maisonneuve

Montréal-Nord

Mount Royal

Outremont

Pierrefonds-Senneville

Le Plateau-Mont-Royal

Pointe-Claire

Rivière-des-Prairies–Pointe-aux-Trembles–Montréal-Est

Rosemont–La Petite-Patrie

Saint-Laurent

Saint-Léonard

Le Sud-Ouest

Verdun

Ville-Marie

Villeray–Saint-Michel–Parc-Extension

Westmount

References

2001 Quebec municipal elections
Municipal elections in Montreal
2000s in Montreal
2001 in Quebec
November 2001 events in Canada